Below are the squads for the 2012 VFF Cup, hosted by Vietnam.

Vietnam
Coach: Phan Thanh Hùng

South Korea University Selection
Coach: Ha Sung-Joon

Turkmenistan
Coach: Ýazguly Hojageldyýew

Laos
Coach:  Kokichi Kimura

References

External links
 Official website

squads